The Cherry Street lift bridge over the Keating Channel is the smaller of two bascule lift bridges on Cherry Street, in Toronto, Ontario, Canada. The bridge spans the canalized mouth of the Don River where it empties into Toronto Harbour. It is the fourth bridge at that location.

History 

The City of Toronto government once operated a swing bridge over the Keating Channel at or near Cherry Street.
The current bridge, constructed in 1968, is a vehicle and pedestrian bascule bridge, with a metal mesh deck.  The original swing bridge was made of wood, and only carried a single rail line, operated by the Grand Trunk Railway.

The City solicited a bid for the first swing bridge in 1896.
Contractors were allowed to propose either a metal or wood bridge. The Privy Council of Canada approved funding of the bridge in 1900. The wooden bridge was replaced by steel draw bridges in 1912 and 1932.

As originally constructed the bridge supported two lanes of traffic in each direction, and had a  sidewalk on the west side. In 1995, several changes were made to provide "enhanced safety for cyclists, skaters, and pedestrians." As-built the entire deck of the bridge, including the sidewalk, was a steel mesh.  In 1995 vehicle traffic was restricted to one lane in each direction to make room for a  sidewalk on the east side of the bridge, and the expansion of the sidewalk on the west side to  so it could accommodate bicycles as well as pedestrians. The sidewalks were faced with a non-slip plastic fibreglass surface.

In 2006, an inspection showed that the bridge required  million in repairs to corrosion damage. The repairs were completed in April 2007. Key bearings in the bridge broke in 2010; it took time for replacement bearings to be found in Sweden. The bridge wasn't restored to working order until June 27, 2011.

On August 1, 2019, the bridge failed to lower. It remained locked in its upright position for several weeks. A crane was used to lower the bridge to the horizontal position. The bridge is currently under repair.

Future
The City of Toronto government's long-term plans are to "renaturalize" the mouth of the Don River. Under this plan the Keating Channel will be retained, due to its historic value, but a new more natural-appearing channel would be constructed south of the Keating Channel.

The current bridge will be replaced by the new Cherry Street North bridges. The pre-fabricated spans for the two side-by-side bridges are expected to be delivered by 2022.

See also
 Cherry Street Strauss Trunnion Bascule Bridge

References

Bridges in Toronto
Bascule bridges